The Aster typeface, which originated in Italy, was designed in 1958 by Francesco Simoncini for Simoncini SA to be used in newspapers and books. This typeface is fairly wide with detailed, delicate serifs; it also has short ascenders and descenders for economy of space. The New Aster font family offers a few distinguishing marks, like the spurs of capitals A, N, V and W.

References 

Modern serif typefaces
Letterpress typefaces
Photocomposition typefaces
Digital typefaces
Typefaces and fonts introduced in 1958